The Roman Catholic Archdiocese of Ciudad Bolívar is an archdiocese located in the city of Ciudad Bolívar in Venezuela.

History
20 May 1790: Established as Diocese of Santo Tomás de Guayana from the Diocese of Puerto Rico in Puerto Rico
20 January 1953: Renamed as Diocese of Ciudad Bolívar 
21 June 1958: Promoted as Metropolitan Archdiocese of Ciudad Bolívar

Bishops

Ordinaries
Francisco de Ibarra y Herrera † (19 Dec 1791 – 14 Dec 1798) Appointed, Bishop of Caracas
José Antonio García Mohedano † (11 Aug 1800 – 17 Oct 1804)
Mariano Talavera y Garcés † (22 Dec 1828 – 1842)
Mariano Fernández Fortique † (12 Jul 1841 – 6 Feb 1854)
José Manuel Arroyo y Niño † (19 Jun 1856 – 30 Nov 1884)
Manuel Felipe Rodríguez Delgado † (30 Jul 1885 – 13 Dec 1887)
Antonio María Durán † (25 Sep 1891 – 18 Jul 1917)
Sixto Sosa Díaz † (5 Dec 1918 – 16 Jun 1923) Appointed, Bishop of Cumaná
Miguel Antonio Mejía † (22 Jun 1923 – 6 Oct 1947)
Juan José Bernal Ortiz † (21 Oct 1949 – 25 Jul 1965) Appointed, Archbishop (Personal Title) of Los Teques
Crisanto Darío Mata Cova † (30 Apr 1966 – 26 May 1986)
Medardo Luis Luzardo Romero † (26 May 1986 – 27 Aug 2011)
Ulises Antonio Gutiérrez Reyes, O. de M. (27 Aug 2011 – present)

Auxiliary bishops
Tomás Enrique Márquez Gómez (1963-1966), appointed Bishop of San Felipe
Francisco de Guruceaga Iturriza (1967-1969), appointed Bishop of Margarita
José de Jesús Nuñez Viloria (1982-1987), appointed Bishop of Ciudad Guayana

Suffragan dioceses
 Ciudad Guayana 
 Maturín

See also
Roman Catholicism in Venezuela

References
 Catholicer Network

Sources
 GCatholic.org
 Catholic Hierarchy 

Roman Catholic dioceses in Venezuela
Roman Catholic Ecclesiastical Province of Ciudad Bolívar
Religious organizations established in 1790
Roman Catholic dioceses and prelatures established in the 18th century
1790 establishments in the Viceroyalty of New Granada